Studor v Bohinju is a village in the Municipality of Bohinj in the Upper Carniola region of Slovenia. Mount Studor rises above the village.

Name
The name of the settlement was changed from Studor to Studor v Bohinju in 1955. The name of the settlement was first attested in 1291 as Ztodar. The name was originally an oronym, *Stodor, derived from Common Slavic *stodorъ 'sharp peak'. The pronunciation Stu- for Sto- is a dialect feature that has become standardized in this toponym.

Hayracks

Studor v Bohinju is known for its group of wooden hayracks just below the village. The double structure of these hayracks is particular to the area and the Studor v Bohinju group of hayracks has been declared an architectural monument. There is also a small ethnographic museum in the village at the Oplen house at Studor v Bohinju no. 16.

References

External links

Studor v Bohinju at Geopedia

Populated places in the Municipality of Bohinj